The Buffalo Bandits are a lacrosse team based in Buffalo, New York playing in the National Lacrosse League (NLL). The 2010 season will be the franchise's 19th season.

Regular season

Conference standings

Game log
Reference:

Playoffs

Game log
Reference:

Transactions

New players
 Chris Driscoll - acquired in trade
 Jon Harasym - acquired in trade
 Frank Resetarits - acquired in trade

Players not returning
 Rich Kilgour - retired
 Pat McCready - traded
 Phil Sanderson - traded

Trades

Entry draft
The 2009 NLL Entry Draft took place on September 9, 2009. The Bandits selected the following players:

Roster

See also
2010 NLL season

References

Buffalo